Ankenytown is an unincorporated community in Knox County, in the U.S. state of Ohio.

History
A post office called Ankenytown operated between 1848 and 1938. The community was named for George Ankeny, an early settler and afterward state legislator. A variant name was Squeal.

References

Unincorporated communities in Knox County, Ohio
1848 establishments in Ohio
Populated places established in 1848
Unincorporated communities in Ohio